Sheraly is a village in Osh Region of Kyrgyzstan. It is part of the Özgön District. Its population was 5,200 in 2021.

Population

References

Populated places in Osh Region